Discovery Hill is a mountain in Barnstable County, Massachusetts. Telegraph Hill is located northwest and Spring Hill is located north of Discovery Hill.

References

Mountains of Massachusetts
Mountains of Barnstable County, Massachusetts